The second inauguration of Grover Cleveland as the 24th president of the United States took place on Saturday, March 4, 1893, at the East Portico of the United States Capitol in Washington, D.C. This was the 27th inauguration and marked the commencement of the second and final four-year term of Grover Cleveland as president and the only term of Adlai Stevenson I as vice president. Cleveland had previously been the 22nd president, and was the only president to serve two non-consecutive terms. Chief Justice Melville Fuller administered the presidential oath of office. It snowed during the inauguration.

See also
Second presidency of Grover Cleveland
First inauguration of Grover Cleveland
1892 United States presidential election

References

External links

 Text of Cleveland's Second Inaugural Address

United States presidential inaugurations
1893 in Washington, D.C.
1893 in American politics
Inauguration
March 1893 events